Stretford and Urmston is a constituency in Greater Manchester represented in the House of Commons of the UK Parliament since a 2022 by-election by Andrew Western, a Labour MP.

History
Stretford and Urmston was created in 1997 from significant parts of the former constituencies of Davyhulme – whose last member was the Conservative Winston Churchill (grandson of the former Prime Minister) – and Stretford, whose last member was Tony Lloyd (Labour).

The constituency was first represented by Beverley Hughes, who stood down at the 2010 general election. Kate Green, a Labour front-bencher, held the seat from 2010 until she resigned in November 2022 after being nominated as Greater Manchester's deputy mayor for policing and crime.

Boundaries 

1997–2004: The Metropolitan Borough of Trafford wards of Bucklow, Clifford, Davyhulme East, Davyhulme West, Flixton, Longford, Park, Stretford, Talbot, and Urmston.

2004–present: The Metropolitan Borough of Trafford wards of Bucklow-St. Martins, Clifford, Davyhulme East, Davyhulme West, Flixton, Gorse Hill, Longford, Stretford, and Urmston.

This is one of three seats in the Metropolitan Borough of Trafford and covers its north and west.  As of 2000, the total electorate for the constituency was 72,414.

Constituency profile
The Conservatives are traditionally strongest in the affluent suburbs of Davyhulme and Flixton, whereas Urmston is often a marginal battle between them and Labour. But in the 2018 and 2019 Local Elections, Labour won every ward in the constituency for the first time ever, gaining Flixton and both Davyhulme wards. These were crucial seats in terms of giving them control of Trafford Council in May 2019. The rest of the wards, which include Stretford and its suburbs, and the areas of Carrington and Partington (Bucklow-St Martins) are strongly Labour. There is significant commercial activity in the north-east of the seat along the ship canal at Trafford Park, which also includes the Trafford Centre, opened in 1998 and is one of the largest shopping centres in the UK.

The seat is also home to Manchester United's Old Trafford football ground as well as the cricket ground of the same name.

The constituency is of approximately average scale in area for Greater Manchester, featuring several green spaces, and is convenient for workers in both the cities of Salford and Manchester. It is the only borough in Greater Manchester to retain state-funded grammar schools, two of which, Stretford Grammar and Urmston Grammar, are in this seat, with the others being in Altrincham in the neighbouring seat.

As to other parties, the Liberal Democrats and UKIP are to date the only parties to have achieved the retention of deposit threshold of 5% of the vote, the former achieving a peak vote share of 16.9% in 2010.

Workless claimants, registered jobseekers, were in November 2012 higher the regional average of 4.4%, at 4.6% of the population based on a statistical compilation by The Guardian.  This in turn was higher than the national average at the time of 3.8%

Members of Parliament

Elections

Elections in the 2020s

Elections in the 2010s

Elections in the 2000s

Elections in the 1990s

See also 
 List of parliamentary constituencies in Greater Manchester

Notes

References

Parliamentary constituencies in Greater Manchester
Constituencies of the Parliament of the United Kingdom established in 1997
Politics of Trafford